Alfred Gregory FBIPP, FRPS (Hon) (12 February 1913 – 9 February 2010) was a British mountaineer, explorer and professional photographer. A member of the 1953 British Mount Everest Expedition that made the first ascent of Mount Everest, he was in charge of stills photography and, as a climbing member of the team, reached 28,000 feet (8,500 metres) in support of the successful Hillary-Tenzing assault on the summit.

Early life
Gregory was educated at Blackpool Grammar School. Before World War II he climbed extensively in the Lake District of England, Scotland and the Alps, and during the 1940s he led several new routes in Britain. During the war he was an officer in the Black Watch, serving in North Africa and Italy. In 1952 he joined Eric Shipton’s Cho Oyu expedition and during the 1950s he led several expeditions to Rolwaling and the Gauri Sankar massif, where 19 peaks were climbed and a plane table survey was made, and to Ama Dablam, Distigil Sar, the Karakoram and the Cordillera Blanca in Peru.

Photography
For 20 years he worked freelance for Kodak UK, lecturing on photography and presenting his pictures to large audiences throughout Britain and Europe.

He spent a lifetime travelling on photographic assignments around the world and his pictures were regularly syndicated to 35 countries. Along with his wife Sue he produced many photojournalistic picture stories through the Tom Blau Camera Press News Agency in London. His work has been exhibited throughout Britain, France, Belgium, America, Africa, Poland and Australia.

In 2002 they held a joint exhibition at the 80 Gold Street Gallery, in Collingwood, Victoria, with photographs of 'Walls, Doors and Windows'.

Death
Gregory died "peacefully in his sleep" on 9 February 2010 in Emerald, Victoria, where he spent the last 15 years of his life with wife Suzanne. He was three days shy of his 97th birthday.

Publications
The Picture of Everest (1953)
Alfred Gregory’s Everest (published for the 40th anniversary of the first ascent)
Blackpool: a Celebration of the 60s
Alfred Gregory: Photographs from Everest to Africa

References

External links
 Imagining Everest (The Royal Geographic Society)
 Extract from his book, Alfred Gregory: Photographs from Everest to Africa at Penguin
 Transcript of interview with Gregory from ABC's 7:30 Report
 Alf Gregory – Daily Telegraph obituary

1913 births
2010 deaths
Photographers from Lancashire
English mountain climbers
English explorers
English photojournalists
English non-fiction writers
Black Watch officers
British Army personnel of World War II
English male non-fiction writers
English emigrants to Australia